Joseph H. Carens is a professor at the Department of Political Science of the University of Toronto, Canada. His research interests are mainly focused on contemporary political theory, especially on issues related to immigration and political community. Carens is an advocate of open borders, and often considered a leading ethical theorist in the field of immigration.

Education and career

Carens received his A.B. in philosophy from the College of the Holy Cross, and a MPhil and Ph.D. in political science and an MPhil in religious studies from Yale University. Before moving to the University of Toronto, he taught at North Carolina State University, Lake Forest College, Wesleyan University, and Princeton University.

Personal life
Carens is married to Feminist Theorist Jennifer Nedelsky, and has two children.

Partial bibliography

The Ethics of Immigration (Oxford, 2013)
Immigrants and the Right to Stay (Boston Review/MIT, 2010)
Culture, Citizenship, and Community: A Contextual Exploration of Justice as Evenhandedness (Oxford, 2000) 
Equality, Moral Incentives, and the Market: An Essay in Utopian Politico-Economic Theory (Chicago, 1981)
Democracy and Possessive Individualism: The Intellectual Legacy of C.B. Macpherson (Editor) (SUNY Press, 1993) Is Quebec Nationalism Just? Perspectives from Anglophone Canada (Editor) (McGill-Queen's University Press, 1995)

Further reading
Hoesch and Mooren (2020), Between Aliens and Citizens. An Outline of Joseph Carens’s Political Philosophy. In Joseph Carens: Between Aliens and Citizens, Springer Cham, 3-14
Carens (2000), Culture, Citizenship and Community, A Contextual Exploration of Justice as Evenhandedness'', Oxford University Press Inc, New York

References

Canadian political scientists
College of the Holy Cross alumni
Lake Forest College faculty
Living people
Academic staff of the University of Toronto
Wesleyan University faculty
Yale Graduate School of Arts and Sciences alumni
Year of birth missing (living people)